Philippe-Auguste Choquette (January 6, 1854 – December 20, 1948) was a Canadian Member of Parliament and Senator.

Biography
He was born on January 6, 1854, in Beloeil, Canada East to Joseph Choquette and Thaïs Audet. He studied at Université Laval and was admitted to the Quebec Bar in 1880 and to the King's Council in 1890.

After running unsuccessfully in the 1882 election, he was elected as a Liberal in the riding of Montmagny in the 1887 election. He was re-elected in 1891 and 1896. From 1898 until 1904, he was a Judge in the Quebec Superior Court, Arthabaska District. In 1904, he was appointed to the Senate representing the Senatorial division of Grandville, Quebec. He resigned in 1919.  He also served as President of Quebec Bulldogs hockey club for several years, winning the Stanley Cup in 1912, and 1913.

He died on December 20, 1948.

Legacy
He is the father of Fernand Choquette, a Quebec MNA and judge of the Quebec Court of Appeal.

Electoral record

References
 
 Philippe-Auguste Choquette fonds, Library and Archives Canada
 

1854 births
1948 deaths
Canadian senators from Quebec
French Quebecers
Liberal Party of Canada MPs
Liberal Party of Canada senators
Members of the House of Commons of Canada from Quebec
Lawyers in Quebec
Judges in Quebec
Université Laval alumni
People from Montérégie
People from Beloeil, Quebec